Hawley was an unincorporated community in Blaine County, in the U.S. state of Idaho.   A variant name was "Hawley Siding".

History
The community was named after James H. Hawley, 9th Governor of Idaho.

References

Unincorporated communities in Blaine County, Idaho